Dweomer may refer to:
Dweomer (Dungeons & Dragons), the magical aura on an enchanted item in the Dungeons & Dragons role-playing game
Dweomer, a city of magicians in the Fabled Lands game books
Dweomer, a form of magic in the Deverry Cycle fantasy novels

See also
Dwemer, a race in The Elder Scrolls role-playing video games
Dweomerlak (disambiguation)